Mony Mony is a studio album by Tommy James and the Shondells. It was released in 1968. The record includes the band's hit single "Mony Mony" which reached #1 on the UK Singles Chart and #3 on the Billboard Hot 100.  It reached #193 on the Billboard 200. While trying to come up with lyrics for the music they had already recorded, James spotted a sign for Mutual of New York, sing their acronym MONY.

Track listing

Charts
Album

Singles

References

1968 albums
Tommy James and the Shondells albums
Roulette Records albums